Cheng Lei (born on August 26, 1971) is a Chinese television presenter.

Cheng Lei was a student in Shanghai Theater Academy in 1990s. After graduation, he was chosen as a host for Broken Brain (智力大沖浪) by Shanghainese producer Xiao Chen. He also worked on several interviews.

Cheng's family has a long history of liver disease. In 2000, he was diagnosed with Hepatitis B. On January 18, 2004, he took a temporary leave from television though he said in a statement that he would take advanced courses abroad. On February 22, 2005, he returned to television. In June 2007, he was sick once again but he re-appeared on a television show called Dating on Saturdays (相約星期六). He has hosted the British-imports China's Got Talent, Chinese Idol, and Top Gear.

TV host 
 1994–2004 Broken Brain (智力大沖浪)
 2006–2010 Dating on Saturdays (相約星期六)
 2010 We Are Family (華人大綜藝)
 2010 The All or Nothing Show (達芬奇密碼)
 2010–2013 China's Got Talent (season 1-4)
 2012 The Cube (梦立方)
 2012–present Super Diva (妈妈咪呀)
 2013–2014 Chinese Idol (中国梦之声)
 2013 So You Think You Can Dance (舞林争霸)
 2014–2015 Top Gear China (巅峰拍档)

References

1971 births
Living people
China's Got Talent
People from Shanghai
Chinese television presenters